The Big Bull was a large (14 metres × 21 metres) Holstein bull fibreglass model located near Wauchope, New South Wales, Australia. When open, it contained a gift shop on the ground floor and a beef display.

It was located just off the Oxley Highway between Wauchope and the Pacific Highway. The structure was torn down in October 2007.

The Big Bull notably had a swinging set of testicles.

See also

Australia's big things
List of world's largest roadside attractions
Timbertown

References

External links
Australian Big Things

Big things in New South Wales
Animal sculptures in Australia
Cattle in art
Concrete sculptures in Australia
2007 disestablishments in Australia